The enzyme threonine-phosphate decarboxylase catalyzes the chemical reaction

L-threonine O-3-phosphate  (R)-1-aminopropan-2-yl phosphate + CO2

This enzyme belongs to the family of lyases, specifically the carboxy-lyases, which cleave carbon-carbon bonds.  The systematic name of this enzyme class is L-threonine-O-3-phosphate carboxy-lyase [(R)-1-aminopropan-2-yl-phosphate-forming]. Other names in common use include L-threonine-O-3-phosphate decarboxylase, CobD and L-threonine-O-3-phosphate carboxy-lyase.  This enzyme is part of the biosynthetic pathway to cobalamin (vitamin B12) in anaerobic bacteria such as Salmonella typhimurium and Bacillus megaterium. In the next step, (R)-1-aminopropan-2-ol is attached to adenosylcobyric acid, forming adenosylcobinamide phosphate.

See also
 Cobalamin biosynthesis

References

 
 
 
 

EC 4.1.1
Enzymes of unknown structure